Paramesia alhamana is a species of moth of the family Tortricidae. It is found in Portugal and Spain.

The wingspan is 11–12 mm. The ground colour of the forewings is brownish ash-grey with dark brown markings. The hindwings are uniform dark brown. Adults have been recorded on wing from June to July.

References

	

Moths described in 1933
Archipini